Dibya Mani Rajbhandari (or Dibyamani Rajbhandari) is a Nepali politician and a member of the House of Representatives of the federal parliament of Nepal. He was elected under the proportional representation system from Nepali Congress filling the reserved seat for the Indigenous group.

References

Living people
Nepal MPs 2017–2022
Nepali Congress politicians from Bagmati Province
1955 births